George William Rudkin (22 June 1912 – 2003) was an English professional footballer who played in the Football League for Carlisle United and Mansfield Town.

References

1912 births
2003 deaths
English footballers
Association football inside forwards
English Football League players
Grantham Town F.C. players
Mansfield Town F.C. players
Carlisle United F.C. players
Boston United F.C. players
Chesterfield F.C. players